Nictaux South is a community in the Canadian province of Nova Scotia, located in Annapolis County, on Nova Scotia Route 10, south of Nictaux Falls and Nictaux.

References

Communities in Annapolis County, Nova Scotia